Afarsia is a  Palearctic genus of butterflies in the family Lycaenidae.It has been synonymized with Albulina by some authors, but studies on the molecular phylogenetics of Polyommatini have led to its treatment as an independent genus, which appears as the sister group of the genus Kretania sensu lato, with weak support.

Species
Listed alphabetically:

 Afarsia antoninae (Lukhtanov, 1999) Tian Shan
 Afarsia ashretha (Evans, 1925) Tadjikistan, Pakistan
 Afarsia hanna (Evans, 1932) Tadjikistan, Pakistan, Afghanistan.
 Afarsia iris (Lang, 1884) sometimes considered a subspecies of Afarsia sieversii.
 Afarsia jurii (Tshikolovets, 1997) sometimes considered a subspecies of Afarsia rutilans.
 Afarsia morgiana (Kirby, 1871) Armenia, Turkey, Iran
 Afarsia neoiris (Tshikolovets, 1997) Tadjikistan
 Afarsia omotoi (Forster, 1972) Afghanistan
 Afarsia rutilans (Staudinger, 1886) Alay mountains
 Afarsia sieversii (Christoph, 1873) Iran, Turkestan, Pamir

References

External links

Polyommatini
Lycaenidae genera